The following is a timeline of the history of the city of Bogotá, Colombia.

Prehistory 

 The area around Bogotá was inhabited since the late Pleistocene, with sites El Abra (12,500 BP), Aguazuque and Tequendama as earliest evidences of inhabitation

Pre-conquest 

 <1537 - Bogotá and its surroundings was called Bacatá by the Muisca who inhabited the Bogotá savanna and were organised in their loose Muisca Confederation

16th century 

 1538 - Santa Fe de Bogotá founded by Spanish conquistador Gonzalo Jiménez de Quesada.
 1539 - 27 April: Municipal council in session
 1540 - City status granted by Charles I of the Spanish Empire
 1549 - City becomes capital of the New Kingdom of Granada
 1550 - Santo Domingo convent founded.
 1553 - Main Plaza relocated
 1557 - Santo Domingo convent relocated
 1558 - Smallpox epidemic
 1561 - Roman Catholic Diocese of Santafé en Nueva Granada established
 1564 - Archbishop Juan de los Barrios gifts his house for the establishment of the San Pedro hospital
 1565 - Chapel built
 1578 - The entrepreneur and landowner Francisco Hernán Sanchéz, urbanizes the surrounding areas to the river and builds a temple
 1580 - Saint Thomas Aquinas University founded
 1592 - San Bartolomé Seminar School founded

17th century

 1604 - Jesuit college established
 1616 - Population: 3,000
 1621
 Mint established
 Church of San Francisco built.
 1635 - Iglesia de San Ignacio (church) opens
 1653 - Our Lady of the Rosary University founded
 1674 - Santa Clara church built
 1675 - Leprosy epidemic
 1681 - Typhus epidemic
 1692 - Measles epidemic

18th century 

 1714 - Earthquake
 1717 - City becomes capital of the Viceroyalty of New Granada
 1739 - The San Pedro hospital is renamed as the San Juan de Dios hospital
 1777 - Real Biblioteca Publica (library) founded
 1781 - The rebellion of the Comuneros (commoners in English) takes place
 1782 - José Antonio Galán and other leaders of the Comuneros are hanged in the Plaza Mayor de Santafé
 1783 - La Enseñanza school founded
 1785 - Earthquake
 1789 - Population: 18,161
 1791
 First map of the city is made by Domingo Esquiaqui
Papel periódico de la Ciudad de Santa Fe de Bogota newspaper begins publication

19th century 

 1801 - Population: 21,394
 1803 - Observatorio Astronómico constructed
 1810 - City becomes capital of the Free and Independent State of Cundinamarca
 1811 - Local revolt against Spanish rule.
 1816
 Spaniard Pablo Morillo in power
 Puerta Falsa cafe in business
 1819
 Battle of Boyacá and the Spanish evacuate.
 Santafé de Bogotá is renamed as Bogotá
 Population: 30,000
 1823 - Primatial Cathedral of Bogotá completed.
 1824 - Colombian National Museum opens
 1836 - Central Cemetery of Bogotá established
 1840
 Trolleybus starts operating
 El Día newspaper begins publication
 1846
 Sociedad Filarmonica founded
 Caja de Ahorros (bank) established
 Statue of Simón Bolívar is erected in the center of the Plaza Mayor
 Police Force of Bogotá established
 1847 - Society of Artisans organized
 1864 - Medicine & Natural Sciences Society founded
 1865 - Telegraph begins operating
 1867 - Universidad Nacional de Colombia (national university) is founded
 1870 - Banco de Bogota founded
 1871 - Academia Colombiana de la Lengua (national language academy) founded
 1875 - Capitol building constructed
 1876 - Prison begins operating.
 1881 - Papel Periódico Ilustrado begins publication
 1884
 Compañía Colombiana de Teléfonos (telephone company) established
 Tramway begins operating
 1886 - Universidad Externado de Colombia and Escuela de Bellas Artes (school) founded
 1887 - The aqueduct is upgraded to an iron aqueduct pipe
 1889
 Bogotá Savannah Railway begins operating.
 Bogotá Electric Light Company is founded
 1890 - Bavaria brewery in business
 1891 - The Medicine & Sciences Society is renamed as Academia de Medicina (Colombia), (Medicine Academy)
 1892
 Usaquen train station of the Ferrocarril del Norte (Bogotá) inaugurated
 Teatro de Cristóbal Colón inaugurated
 1893
 January: riots
 El Artesano newspaper begins publication
 1895
 Municipal Theatre inaugurated
 Population: 95,813
 1896 - The glass factory Fenicia established
 1898
 Hipodromo de la Gran Sabana (racecourse) inaugurated
 Revista Ilustrada begins publication
 1900 - 31 July: Coup

20th century 

 1902
 Academia Colombiana de Historia (history academy) founded
 The Edificio de Lievano (city hall) set
 1905 - Population: 100.000
 1908 - Palacio de Nariño dedicated
 1909
 Compañia de Cementos Samper (cement company) established
 Electric streetcar begins operating
 1910
 Exposición del Centenario de la independencia (world's fair) held
 Javier Tobar Ahumada becomes mayor
 1911
 First airplane lands in Bogotá for an exhibition
 El Tiempo newspaper begins publication
 1912
 Population: 121,257
 Carlos Eduardo Padilla builds an airplane and flies over Chapinero
 1915 - El Espectador newspaper begins publication in Bogota
 1918
 Population: 143.994
 Flu epidemic
 1921 - First student strike
 1922 - Quinta de Bolívar museum inaugurated
 1923 - Police headquarters building constructed
 1926 - Capitolio Nacional built
 1928
 Bogotá Stock Exchange established
 Population: 235,421
 1929 - Medellín-Bogota railway begins operating
 1930
  (aerodrome) is built
 The Voz de la Victor (radio) founded
 1931 - Santamaría Bullring constructed
 1933 - First Juegos Atléticos Nacionales takes place
 1936 - El Siglo newspaper begins publication
 1937 - University City (campus) of National University of Colombia built
 1938
 Estadio El Campín, Alfonso López Pumarejo Stadium, and National Library building constructed
 400th anniversary of city founding
 Avenida de Las Américas (avenue) built
 Population: 336,996
 First  (book fair) inaugurated
 1939 - Gold Museum established
 1941 - Corporación Deportiva Santa Fe (football club) formed
 1946 - Millonarios Fútbol Club formed
 1947 - Architect Le Corbusier is hired to conduct the city planning
 1948
 March–April: International Conference of American States held
 9 April: Bogotazo
 District University of Bogotá and University of the Andes established
 1951 - Population: 648,324.
 1952 - City flag design adopted
 1953 - Bogotá Museum of Modern Art inaugurated
 1954
 Bosa, Engativa, Fontibon, Suba, Usme, and Usaquen townships become part of city
 First television transmission is made
 Colombian Film Archive founded
 La Republica newspaper begins publication
 Mass migration from other regions in Colombia to Bogotá, due to violence since the Bogotazo
 Corferias (Fair and Exposition Corporation of Bogotá) founded
 1955 - Bogotá Botanical Garden opens
 1956 - University of America founded
 1958
 Construction of the 26th Avenue begins
 Luis Ángel Arango Library opens
 1959
 El Dorado Airport in operation
 Corficolombiana headquartered in Bogota
 1960 - Population: 1,271,700
 1961 - John F. Kennedy visits Bogotá
 1963 - Puente Aranda becomes part of the city
 1964
 Population: 1'697.311
 Charles de Gaulle visits Bogotá
 1965 - El Espacio newspaper begins publication
 1967 - Bogotá Philharmonic founded
 1968
 August: Pope Paul VI visits the city
 Simón Bolívar Park inaugurated
 Embajador Theater opens as one of the few cinemas in the city.
 Fuerza Aérea de Colombia (national air force) establishes the Aeronautical Museum in the old airport of Techo
 1969 - Avianca Building constructed
 1970 - Catholic University of Colombia founded
 1973 - Population: 2,855,065.
 1974 - Ciclovía inaugurated
 1976 - First shopping center in the city, Unicentro (Bogotá) opens
 1977 - Centro de Comercio Internacional built
 1978 - Torre Colpatria built
 1979
 93 Park inaugurated.
 Leftist guerrilla M-19 takes the embassy of Dominican Republic
 1982 - Military University Nueva Granada established
 1984
 Bus terminal inaugurated
 Metrópolis shopping center inaugurated
 Bogotá Film Festival begins
 1985
 6 November: Palace of Justice siege
 Population: 3,974,813.
 1986
 3 July: Pope John Paul II visits the city
 Children's Museum of Bogotá established
 1987 - Housing complex Ciudad Salitre construction begins
 1988
 Andrés Pastrana Arango first mayor of Bogotá elected by popular vote, previously they were elected by the president or governor
 Iberoamerican Theater Festival held
 1989
 Archivo General de la Nación (government department) inaugurated
 6 December: Bombing in Paloquemao
 Santa Barbara shopping center opens

1990s

 1990 - La Equidad football club formed
 1991 - Juan Martín Caicedo Ferrer becomes mayor
 1992 - Sonia Durán de Infante becomes mayor, succeeded by Jaime Castro Castro
 1993
 Population: 5'484.244
 November: Bombing on 15th Avenue
 1995
Rock al Parque music festival begins
 Antanas Mockus Sivickas becomes mayor
 Centro Andino shopping mall opens
 September: Track Cycling World Championships held at Luis Carlos Galán Velodrome
 McDonald’s opens its first restaurant in Colombia.
 1996
 Casa de Moneda de Colombia (museum) inaugurated
 Paul Bromberg Silverstein becomes mayor
 1998
 Maloka Museum of science inaugurated
 Enrique Peñalosa Londoño becomes mayor
 1999
 Citytv Bogotá begins broadcasting
 Louis Vuitton and Bvlgari opens its first boutique in Colombia.
 Mormon temple dedicated
 2000
 TransMilenio bus system begins operating
 24 February: Car-Free Day inaugurated

21st century

2000s

 2001
Colombian Securities Exchange headquartered in city
 Antanas Mockus Sivickas becomes mayor
 July: Copa América football tournament held at El Campín Stadium
 September: Hard Rock Café opens in Bogotá, and Colombia.
 2002
 25 January: Bombing
 7 August: Attack at Presidential Palace
 13 December: Hotel bombing
 2003
 National Symphony Orchestra of Colombia founded
 7 February: El Nogal Club bombing
 8 October: Bombing
 15 November: Attack in pub
 2004
 Luis Eduardo Garzón becomes mayor
 29 October: Bombing
 2005
Versace opens its first boutique in Colombia.
 Bogotá's Carnival resurrected
 Population: 6,778,691
 2006
 Bike Paths Network laid out
 Centro Comercial Santafé shopping mall opens
 31 July: Bombing
 2007 
 May: Inditex starts operations in Bogotá, and Colombia.
 City named World Book Capital by UNESCO.
 2008
 April: Ermenegildo Zegna opens its first boutique in Colombia.
 La Peluquería (art space) founded
 Samuel Moreno Rojas becomes mayor
 2009 
 Fundación Capital headquartered in city
 October: The MTV Awards were for first time held in Colombia.

2010s

 2010 - Caracol Radio headquarters bombing.
 2011 - María Fernanda Campo becomes mayor, succeeded by Clara López Obregón
 2012 
 March: Cartier opens its first jewelry in Colombia.
 Gustavo Petro becomes mayor
 Forever 21 opens its first store in Latin America in Bogotá.
 2013
Google Street View begins operating.
 Total Renew of El Dorado International Airport.
 Dolce & Gabbana opens its first Boutique in Colombia.
 December: Pro-Petro demonstration
 2014 
 February: Burberry opens its first boutique in Colombia.
 September: Tiffany & Co. opens its first Jewelry in Colombia.
 Population: 7,776,845 (urban agglomeration).
 Nickelodeon’s Kids’ Choice Awards were for first time held in Colombia.
 2015 
 April: Book fair collapsed by YouTubers.
 BD Bacatá becomes the tallest building in Colombia.
 Starbucks opens its controversial first coffee shop in Colombia.
 2016 
Population: 7,980,001.
 Parque La Colina shopping mall opens.
 Enrique Peñalosa becomes mayor for second time.
 2017

H&M opens its first Store in Colombia.
 Pope Francis visits the city.
 Centro Andino Bombing
 Multiplaza La Felicidad Shopping Mall opens.
 2018 - The Coliseo Cubierto el Campín was remodeled and renamed as Movistar Arena.

See also 

 History of Bogotá
 List of mayors of Bogotá
 Metropolitan Area of Bogotá
 List of universities in Bogotá
 Timeline of Colombian history

Other cities in Colombia:
 Timeline of Cali
 Timeline of Cartagena
 Timeline of Ocaña, Colombia

References 

This article incorporates information from the Spanish language Wikipedia

Bibliography

in English 
Published in the 19th century
 
 
 
 
 
 
 
 
 
 
 
 

Published in the 20th century
 
 
 
 
 
 
 
 
 
 

Published in the 21st century
 
 
  (about Bogota, Cali, Medellin)
 
 Zeiderman, A., 2013. 'Living Dangerously: Biopolitics and urban citizenship in Bogotá, Colombia', American Ethnologist 40(1):71-87.

in Spanish 
 
 
  (Annotated list of titles published in Bogotá, arranged chronologically)
 
  (includes timeline)

External links 

 Items related to Bogotá, various dates (via Digital Public Library of America)
 Items related to Bogotá, various dates (via Europeana)

Timeline
Bogota
Bogota
Bogota
Years in Colombia
Bogota
Bogotá